The following railroads have been known as Western Railroad or Western Railway:
Western Railroad Company, builders of a Heavener, Oklahoma to Waldron, Arkansas line now operated by the Arkansas Southern Railroad
Western Railroad (Texas) of New Braunfels
Western Railroad of Alabama
Western Railway of Alabama
Western Railway of Arizona
Western Railway of Florida
Western Railroad (Massachusetts), 1833-1867, predecessor of the Boston and Albany Railroad
Western Railroad of Minnesota
Western Railroad (North Carolina), 1852-1879, predecessor of the Southern Railway
Rutland Railway
Western Railway Zone (India)
West railway of Austria
Western Railways and Light Company (a holding company for street railways in the U.S. Midwest)